Dare to Love is the 1995 second solo album by Jimmy Somerville, former lead singer of the synthpop groups Bronski Beat and The Communards.

Track listing

 "Heartbeat" (Jimmy Somerville, Matt Rowe, Richard Stannard)
 "Hurts So Good" (Phillip Mitchell)
 "Cry" (Somerville, Gary Butcher)
 "Lovething" (Somerville, Butcher)
 "By Your Side" (Matt Rowe, Somerville, Richard Stannard)
 "Dare to Love" (Somerville, Butcher)
 "Someday We'll Be Together" (Harvey Fuqua, Jackey Beavers, Johnny Bristol)
 "Alright" (Somerville, Butcher)
 "Too Much of a Good Thing" (Jules Shear, Stephen Hague)
 "A Dream Gone Wrong" (Somerville, Butcher)
 "Come Lately" (Somerville, Butcher)
 "Safe in These Arms" (Somerville, Butcher)
 "Because of Him" (Somerville, Butcher)

Personnel
Jimmy Somerville - vocals
 Carol Kenyon – backing vocals (tracks: 1, 8, 13)
 Chyna Gordon – backing vocals (tracks: 6, 10, 12)
 Geoffrey Williams – backing vocals (tracks: 1, 3, 7, 8, 13)
 Matthew David – backing vocals (tracks: 2-4, 7, 9)
 Paul Lewis – backing vocals (tracks: 1-4, 6, 9, 10, 12)
 Phil Spalding – bass (tracks: 1, 6-8, 10, 12, 13)
 Jeremy Meehan - bass (track: 3)
 Andy Duncan – drums (tracks: 6 to 8, 12, 13), percussion (tracks: 1-4, 10, 12)
 David Beebe – drums (tracks: 2, 3, 10)
 Gary Butcher – guitar (tracks: 3, 6, 8, 10, 12)
 Glenn Nightingale - guitar (track: 2)
 The Kick Horns – horns (tracks: 2, 9, 11)
 J. J. Nash – keyboards (tracks: 6, 7, 10, 12)
 Jonn Savannah – keyboards (tracks: 2, 3, 8)
 Flash - guitar, bass (track: 2)
 Victor Johnson - guitar, bass (track: 11)
Sally Herbert - violin (track: 13)
Audrey Riley, Chris Pitsillides, Leo Payne, Sally Fenton - strings (track: 3)
Sian Bell, Sonia Slany - strings (track: 5)
Chris Tombling, Jayne Harris, Leo Payne - strings (track: 7)

References

External links
 Jimmy Somerville's official website

1995 albums
Jimmy Somerville albums
albums produced by Stephen Hague
London Records albums